DNA polymerase subunit gamma-2, mitochondrial is a protein that in humans is encoded by the POLG2 gene.  The POLG2 gene encodes a 55 kDa accessory subunit protein that imparts high processivity and salt tolerance to the catalytic subunit of DNA polymerase gamma, encoded by the POLG gene. Mutations in this gene result in autosomal dominant progressive external ophthalmoplegia with mitochondrial DNA deletions.

Structure 
POLG2 is located on the q arm of chromosome 17 in position 23.3 and has 8 exons. POLG2, the protein encoded by this gene, contains a phosphoserine modified residue at p. 38 and a transit peptide. Its structure consists of 25 beta strands, 21 alpha helixes, and 8 turns.

Function 
POLG2 encodes the processivity subunit of the mitochondrial DNA polymerase gamma. The encoded protein forms a heterotrimer containing one catalytic subunit and two processivity subunits. This protein enhances DNA binding, stimulates polymerase and exonuclease activity, and promotes processive DNA synthesis.

Catalytic activity 
Deoxynucleoside triphosphate + DNA(n) = diphosphate + DNA(n+1)

Clinical significance 
Mutations in POLG2 have been associated with progressive external ophthalmoplegia with mitochondrial DNA deletions. This disease results in progressive weakness of ocular muscles and levator muscle of the upper eyelid and patients with it may also manifest skeletal myopathy, ragged-red fibers and atrophy shown on muscle biopsy, cataracts, hearing loss, sensory axonal neuropathy, ataxia, depression, hypogonadism, and parkinsonism. This mutlisystemic disease has been linked to a G451E mutation that disrupts the DNA polymerase gamma subunits.

In patients with chronic hepatitis C, those carrying the DDX5 minor allele or DDX5-POLG2 haplotypes are thought to be at an increased risk of advanced fibrosis. It is important to note, however, that those carrying the CPT1A minor allele are believed to be at a decreased risk.

Interactions 
POLG2 has been shown to have 39 binary protein-protein interactions including 19 co-complex interactions. POLG2 appears to interact with POLG.

References

Further reading

External links